Soledad High School is a public secondary school located in Soledad, California, United States. A part of Soledad Unified School District, it was opened in 1999 and is the largest high school in south Monterey County, serving grades 9 through 12.  In 2013, the school had approximately 1,401 students.  The Monterey County Free Libraries Soledad Branch is located on the school's north-west part of campus, serving the high school as well as the public. Soledad High School's mascot is the Aztec Warrior. The school is being run by its seventh principal in 15 years.

History

Prior to the opening of Soledad High School in 1999, students from Soledad attended Gonzales High School in Gonzales, located nine miles north of Soledad.

The creation of Soledad High School was spearheaded by Gene Martin, SUSD Superintendent 1994-2003. At the Soledad High School main entrance is a statue dedicated to Gene Martin in honor of his "commitment, master financing, vision, foresight and planning."

Academics 
A school's Academic Performance Index is a scale that ranges from 200 to 1000, and is calculated from the school's performance in the Standardized Testing and Reporting (STAR) Program. The state has set 800 as the API target for all schools to meet. California uses the API to measure annual school performance and year-to-year improvement.

Advanced Placement courses at Soledad High School include:

Clubs

Future Farmers of America (FFA): Being located at the heart of a major global food supplying region (Salinas Valley), the Soledad Future Farmers of America Chapter helps students learn about agriculture. The award-winning Soledad FFA organization had two students consecutively named to California State Officer Positions in 2007 and 2008.

MESA (Mathematics, Engineering, Science Achievement) is a club designed to help students who are interested in math and the different sciences offered at Soledad High School and beyond. The Soledad High School MESA program has remained financially stable through budget cutbacks and has attained a high 44% annual rate of student members who attend a four-year university after high school. The program offers tutoring in the math and science departments, and provides its members with educational guidance for attaining a career in math, engineering or science. Anyone is invited to be part of the club. MESA often hosts trips to different universities to help  students become familiar with their campuses and requirements.

Navy Junior Reserve Officers Training Corps: The goal of NJROTC is "to instill in students in [United States] secondary educational institutions the values of citizenship, service to the United States, and personal responsibility and a sense of accomplishment." In 2008, Soledad High School's NJROTC program ranked 16th nationally at the NJROTC National High School Tournament in Pensacola, Florida.

California Scholarship Federation: Soledad High School has had an active California Scholarship Federation Chapter since 2006.  CSF Current Chapters

Anime Club: A club that mainly focuses on watching anime and manga, but also learning more of Japanese culture and how to draw in one's own style. It is the largest non-curricular club in the school.

French Club

Spanish Club: Also known as "Club Azteca", this promotes Spanish heritage and culture.

HOPE Club

Yearbook Club: A class/club of 30-35 students that creates and publishes "The Legend", Soledad High School's award-winning yearbook.

Young Traveler's Club: This club allows students to explore the nation by having them sell boxes of candy to fund trips that cost over $1000.

Athletics

Soledad High School is a member of the Mission Trail Athletic League (MTAL) and California's Central Coast Section (CCS).

Soledad's primary rivals are Carmel High School and Pacific Grove High School and Greenfield high school while still holding onto long time rivalry ties with Gonzales High School, the original high school of Soledad students before the opening of Soledad High School in 1999.

Soledad High School fields athletics teams in football, basketball, baseball, softball, soccer, swimming, cross-country, volleyball, wrestling, and track & field. Its strongest program is boys' soccer, who has won six Mission Trail Athletic League Soccer titles. In 2014, The Salinas Californian recognized Soledad baseball as the Monterey County's Most Winningest Baseball Program from 2009-2013, with 82 regular season victories. In 2016, the football team won the CIF Central Coast Section Division IV Title with a victory over Westmont High School at Independence High School (San Jose, CA). This would be the first section title of any athletics program in the high school's existence. Football, soccer, and track & field all hold home games/meets in Gene Martin Stadium. Volleyball, basketball, and wrestling hold home games/meets in Soledad High School Gym.

Soledad sports include:

Fall sports
Girls' cross country
Boys' cross country
Football
League Titles - 2015, 2017,2022
CIF Section Titles -2016
Girls' volleyball

Winter sports
Boys' soccer
League Titles - 2000, 2005, 2007, 2011, 2012, 2013
Girls' soccer
League Titles - 2015, 2016
Boys' basketball
League Titles - 2005
Girls' basketball
Boys' wrestling
Girls' wrestling

Spring sports
Baseball
League Titles - 2009, 2014
Softball
Boys' track & field
Girls' track & field
Boys' swimming
Girls' swimming
League Titles - 2019

References

Educational institutions established in 1999
High schools in Monterey County, California
Public high schools in California
1999 establishments in California